Pit Leyder (born 11 January 1997 in Bettendorf) is a Luxembourgish former professional cyclist, who rode professionally between 2016 and 2019 for  and for the  team in 2019, as a stagiaire.

Major results 

2015
 National Junior Road Championships
3rd Road race
3rd Time trial
 10th Road race, UCI Junior Road World Championships
2017
 1st  Road race, Games of the Small States of Europe
 9th Ronde van Vlaanderen U23
2018
 National Under-23 Road Championships
1st  Road race
2nd Time trial
 3rd Overall Tour de Luxembourg
1st  Young rider classification
 6th Flèche Ardennaise
 8th Overall Flèche du Sud
 10th Road race, UEC European Under-23 Road Championships
2019
 3rd Road race, National Road Championships
 3rd Time trial, National Under-23 Road Championships
 4th Ronde van Vlaanderen U23
 7th Eschborn–Frankfurt Under–23

References

External links

1997 births
Living people
Luxembourgian male cyclists
People from Diekirch (canton)
European Games competitors for Luxembourg
Cyclists at the 2019 European Games